Ottochloa is a genus of African,  Asian, and Australian plants in the grass family.

 Species
 Ottochloa gracillima C.E.Hubb. - Queensland, New South Wales
 Ottochloa grandiflora Jansen - New Guinea
 Ottochloa nodosa (Kunth) Dandy - tropical Africa, Indian Subcontinent, China, Southeast Asia, New Guinea, Queensland, Northern Territory, Western Australia

References

External links
 Grassbase - The World Online Grass Flora

Panicoideae
Grasses of Africa
Grasses of Asia
Grasses of Oceania
Poaceae genera